Pleiochiton is a genus of flowering plants belonging to the family Melastomataceae.

Its native range is Eastern and Southern Brazil.

Species:

Pleiochiton crassifolius 
Pleiochiton glaziovianus 
Pleiochiton magdalenensis 
Pleiochiton micranthus 
Pleiochiton parasiticum 
Pleiochiton parvifolius 
Pleiochiton roseus 
Pleiochiton setulosus

References

Melastomataceae
Melastomataceae genera
Taxa named by Asa Gray